William Franklin Kern (September 2, 1906 – April 5, 1985) was an American football player and coach. He played college football as a tackle at the University of Pittsburgh in 1925 and 1927 and then with the Green Bay Packers of the National Football League (NFL) in 1929 and 1930. Kern served as the head football coach at the Carnegie Institute of Technology from 1937 to 1939 and at West Virginia University from 1940 to 1942 and again in 1946 and 1947, compiling a career record of 36–35–2. In 1938, he led the Carnegie Tech Tartans to the Sugar Bowl, where they lost to the national champion TCU Horned Frogs, 15–7.

Playing career
As a player in college, he was a first-team All-American tackle at the University of Pittsburgh in 1927. Following college, Kern played tackle for the NFL's Green Bay Packers in 1929 and 1930.

Coaching career
Kern's tenure at West Virginia was interrupted by military service during World War II. He served as a lieutenant commander in the United States Navy from 1943 to 1945.

Head coaching record

See also
 List of college football head coaches with non-consecutive tenure

References

External links
 
 

1906 births
1985 deaths
American football tackles
Carnegie Mellon Tartans football coaches
Del Monte Pre-Flight Navyators football coaches
Green Bay Packers players
Pittsburgh Panthers football coaches
Pittsburgh Panthers football players
West Virginia Mountaineers football coaches
United States Navy personnel of World War II
United States Navy officers
People from Kingston, Pennsylvania
Players of American football from Pennsylvania